Bronwen Weber is a Canadian-born pastry chef and renowned cake decorator based in Dallas, Texas. 

Born in Calgary, Alberta, over her 30-year career Weber has worked at a variety of bakeries and won numerous awards, including the Oklahoma State Sugar Art Show grand prize in the wedding cake division. She is a frequent competitor on Food Network Challenge cake decorating competitions, having competed over twenty times.

Bronwen currently runs her own cake business serving the DFW region called Bronwen Cakes.

References

External links
 

Living people
People from Calgary
Canadian women chefs
Pastry chefs
Year of birth missing (living people)